Konstantin Valeryevich Olenev (born 11 September 1961) is a Russian professional football coach and a former player.

As a player, he made his debut in 1979 the Soviet Second League in for FC Druzhba Yoshkar-Ola.

References

1961 births
People from Yoshkar-Ola
Living people
Soviet footballers
Russian footballers
Association football goalkeepers
FC Dynamo Kirov players
FC Sokol Saratov players
FC Kuban Krasnodar players
Russian football managers
FC Sokol Saratov managers
Sportspeople from Mari El
FC Volga Ulyanovsk players
FC Spartak Nizhny Novgorod players